The Well Below is a four-song EP by Twin Cities-based Celtic rock band Boiled in Lead, its eighth collection of new material. It includes a cover of Appalachian folk singer Roscoe Holcomb's "Wedding Dress" as well as the band's take on Irish songwriter Christy Moore's murder ballad "The Well Below the Valley."

Critical reception to the album was positive. Huffington Post writer Stephen Winick called the band "a cooler, more American alternative to the Pogues, more skilled at their instruments, with more pure traditional music on one end and more rock electricity on the other," and praised their "hair-raising" and "foreboding" take on "The Well Below the Valley" and "rich, complex arrangement" of the Holcomb song. David Hintz of FolkWorld stated that the album "has the exotic flair we [have] all come to expect from this band."

Track listing

References

2012 EPs
Boiled in Lead albums
Celtic rock albums